Lake Elsinore Diamond, also referred to as Storm Stadium, is a baseball park in Lake Elsinore, California.  It is primarily used for baseball and is the home field of the Lake Elsinore Storm minor league baseball team in the California League. The field at the Lake Elsinore Diamond is named the Pete Lehr Field.

History
It was built in 1994 and has a capacity of over 8,000 people with 6,066 permanent seats.  The original $8 million construction estimate in 1992, however, ballooned to more than $22 million by the time of its completion.

Other uses
The company that currently manages the site is Storm Entertainment, a newly developed entity of Storm Baseball. When baseball is not in season, the field is used for a number of other purposes including concerts, boxing matches, and local high school graduations, all of which can utilize temporary seating to increase the capacity to 14,000.

This stadium also has a yearly event for Halloween, the "Field of Screams".

In December 2017, the park hosted the Stadium Super Trucks racing series' World Championship Finals. To create the course, approximately 150,000 square feet of dirt was brought in. The series returned to the Diamond for its 2018 season opener, while the 2020 edition was canceled due to the COVID-19 pandemic.

Diamond Tap Room
The Diamond Tap Room is the name of the enclosed restaurant and patio in the left field corner. The restaurant has a full menu and is open to the public during all home games. The venue can host various events including birthdays, weddings, etc. It can hold up to 300 guests has several full menus for one's choosing.

Dimensions
Right field is 310 feet away from home plate, with center field at a distance of 400 feet and left field at a distance of 330 feet. The deepest part of the park is the left center power alley at 425 feet. The grass used is Tiffsport, a hybrid Bermuda grass, which is overseeded with ryegrass for the winter.

See also
Lake Elsinore Storm
Lake Elsinore, California
San Diego Padres
Riverside County, California
Minor league baseball
Farm team

References

External links
Official team site
Official managing company site
Official city website

Minor league baseball venues
Baseball venues in California
Boxing venues in California
Sports venues in Riverside County, California
Sports venues in the Inland Empire
1994 establishments in California
Sports venues completed in 1994
California League ballparks